Manners of Dying is a 2004 Canadian drama film based on the short story of the same name (1993) by Yann Martel, winner of the Man Booker Prize for his book, The Life of Pi.

Plot 
Kevin Barlow (Roy Dupuis) will die on schedule and according to regulations. Harry Parlington (Serge Houde), director of the Cantos execution facility, intends to make sure of it. However Barlow chooses to go, be it calmly or fighting to the end, Parlington feels confident that he and his team can deal with the situation. When Barlow makes an unusual final request, a strange duel ensues between the condemned man and the prison director. In this struggle there can be no winner or loser, only two men faced with doubts and difficult choices to make.

Recognition 
 2006 Genie Award for Best Achievement in Editing - Jeremy Peter Allen - Nominated
 2006 Genie Award for Best Achievement in Music - Original Score - Éric Pfalzgraf - Nominated

External links 
 Official Website
 
 

2004 films
Canadian prison drama films
2004 drama films
English-language Canadian films
Films shot in Quebec
Films based on short fiction
2000s prison drama films
2000s English-language films
2000s Canadian films